Ileana Salvador (born 16 January 1962) is a former Italian race walker who won eight medals at the World Championships and European Championships

In 2005 she acquired Swedish citizenship.

Biography
She won ten medals, to senior level, at the International athletics competitions. Specializing in indoor competitions running, boasts six medals (three European silver and three World bronze), just earned indoor. She participated at one edition of the Summer Olympics (1992), she has 29 caps in national team from 1987 to 1996. She was twice World Best Year Performance in Women's Race Walking: 1992 in the 10 km walk and 1993 in the 20 km walk.

Her career and her life, has inspired a book La marcia infinita di Ileana (The neverending racewalking of Ileana), from Valter Esposito (2006, Il Prato publisher).

Personal life
Ileana Salvador is the companion of the Swedish racewalker, Olympic silver medalist and European Championships bronze medalist, Bo Gustafsson, lives in Sweden from 1996. The couple has two daughters, Nicole (born 1995) and Noelle (born 1998) who is a model and in 2019 she participated in the selections for the Miss Italia contest. She is a teacher of italian language and Consular Officer at Embassy of Italy in Sweden.

The bronze medal in Barcelona 1992
At the 1992 Summer Olympics in Barcelona, Ileana Salvador won the bronze medal in the 10 km race walk. Or at least she finished third and for 20 minutes rightly celebrated her triumph, only to discover that she was disqualified for having taken the third red card for irregular racewalking, which entails the disqualification, just when she had entered the Stadium sure of her third position.

Records
She is holder of two world records in not Olympic distance, but recognized by IAAF and former holder of two more records.

World records
 25 km walk: 2:08:46 ( Växjö, 28 September 1996) - current holder
 3000 m walk (track): 11:48:24 ( Padua, 29 August 1993) - current holder
 2 miles walk indoor: 13:11.88 ( Genoa, 14 February 1990) - until 14 September 1996
 10,000 m walk (track): 42:39.2 ( Genoa, 17 June 1989) - until 26 May 1990

European records
 5000 m walk (track): 20:25.2 ( Barcelona, 5 April 1992) - until 11 July 1995

National records
 10,000 m walk (track): 42:23.7 ( Bergen, 8 May 1993) - until 23 April 2017

Achievements

National titles
Salvador won 19 national championships at individual senior level, 15 Italian and 4 Swedish.
Italian Athletics Championships
5000 metres walk: 1989, 1990, 1991, 1992, 1993 (5)
10 km walk: 1987, 1989, 1990, 1992, 1993 (5)
20 km walk: 1993 (1)
Italian Athletics Indoor Championships
3000 metres walk: 1988, 1990, 1992, 1993 (4)

Swedish Athletics Championships
5000 metres walk: 1997 (1)
10 km walk: 1997 (1)
Swedish Athletics Indoor Championships
3000 metres walk: 1997, 2001 (2)

See also
 Italian all-time lists - 20 km walk
 List of world records in athletics
 List of European records in athletics
 Italian records in athletics
 Italy at the IAAF World Race Walking Cup
 Italian team at the running events

References

External links
 
 Ileana Salvador at La marcia nel mondo 

1962 births
Living people
Italian female racewalkers
Swedish female racewalkers
Athletes (track and field) at the 1992 Summer Olympics
Olympic athletes of Italy
World Athletics Championships medalists
World record setters in athletics (track and field)
World record holders in athletics (track and field)
European Athletics Championships medalists
Universiade medalists in athletics (track and field)
World Athletics Championships athletes for Italy
Universiade gold medalists for Italy
World Athletics Indoor Championships medalists
Medalists at the 1989 Summer Universiade
Teachers of Italian